Acts of Violence is a 2018 American action-thriller film directed by Brett Donowho, and stars Bruce Willis, Cole Hauser, Shawn Ashmore, Ashton Holmes, Melissa Bolona, Sophia Bush, and Mike Epps. It was written by Nicolas Aaron Mezzanatto.

The film was released in a limited theatrical engagement and on video-on-demand by Lionsgate Premiere on January 12, 2018. It received highly negative reviews from critics.

Plot
The film focuses on the lives of the McGregor brothers. Two of the brothers, Deklan and Brandon, have served in the military, due to which, they have an expertise in weaponry. The youngest among them, Roman, is engaged to his childhood flame, Mia, and the two are about to get married. While Deklan is traumatized by his past and Brandon has a family to look after, Mia and Roman try to have a good time by partying away their last few days of bachelordom. During one of her bachelorette parties, Mia ends up making two small-time thugs angry, Vince and Frank, both of whom work as sex traffickers for a local kingpin named Max Livingston. After being insulted by Mia, Vince and Frank abduct her from the club and take her to their boss as a special offering.

In the meantime, Detective James Avery relentlessly tries to collect evidence against Max Livingston, but fails to find anything legitimate. Adding to this, the existing corruption in the higher hierarchies of the police department keeps his hands tied.

Before getting abducted, Mia leaves a voice note for Roman, explaining the situation. Realizing that his brother’s military experience could come in handy, Roman calls Deklan and asks him for help. Deklan first makes a 911 call and then tries to raid a home in which he suspects Mia is being kept. Unfortunately for him, Mia is nowhere to be found, and the three brothers land themselves in some serious trouble for breaking several laws. This leads them to Avery, who promises them that he will help them rescue their future sister-in-law and even warns them to stay out of the case.  Deklan, though, refuses to comply with the request of the detective. As a result, the three brothers deck themselves into military-grade vests and weapons and set out to save Mia.

In the final moments of the film, the three brothers raid a warehouse in which Max intends to hide his trafficked girls in trucks before sending them off to Las Vegas. The raid goes as planned, and the three brothers are not only able to rescue Mia, but also many other girls who were being trafficked. As soon as they reach back home, though, Max shows up with his men and they attack them. During this home raid, Brandon gets shot and dies on the spot, but Deklan efficiently manages to kill all of Max’s men. In the nick of time, Max manages to flee the scene before getting shot by Deklan.

Towards the end, Deklan and Roman get arrested by the cops, but Max still walks free. As a result, Avery reaches his absolute limit and resigns from his job as a cop. He then heads over to Max’s secret hideout and shoots him before he can escape town. Ultimately, Deklan, Roman, and Mia get the happy ending that they deserve, while Avery serves justice.

Cast
 Bruce Willis as Detective James Avery
 Cole Hauser as Deklan MacGregor
 Shawn Ashmore as Brandon MacGregor
 Ashton Holmes as Roman MacGregor
 Melissa Bolona as Mia
 Sean Brosnan as Vince
 Sophia Bush as Detective Brooke Baker
 Mike Epps as Max Livington
 Tiffany Brouwer as Jessa MacGregor
 Jenna B. Kelly as Haley
 Patrick St. Esprit as Hemland
 Rotimi as Frank
 Matthew T. Metzler as Richard
 Kyle Stefanski as Davis
 Boyd Kestner as Stevens
 Brian Foster as young Brandon

Production
Principal photography on the filming began in Cleveland, Ohio, in March 2017. Aerial shots of Los Angeles included the Detective Samuel Avery, the Old Central Police Station and the reach of Cleveland.

Reception
As of October 28, 2020, Acts of Violence grossed $386,790 in the United Arab Emirates and Portugal.

Reception
At Metacritic, the film has a weighted average score of 28 out of 100, based on six critics, indicating "generally unfavorable reviews".

References

External links
 
 

2018 action thriller films
2018 independent films
American action thriller films
2010s English-language films
Films shot in Cleveland
American independent films
2010s American films